Lom Phrai Pook Rak was a Thai romantic-drama TV series that aired on Channel 3, it starred Jaron Sorat, Nuttanicha Dungwattanawanich, Thanakorn Poshyananda and Kiatkamol Lata. It's the third drama of project "My hero".

Plot 
Itsara Ratchaphonkun (Jaron Sorat) is a forestry officer. Due to his duties, he had to separate from his wife.

Cast

Main cast 

 Jaron Sorat as Itsara Ratchaphonkun
 Nuttanicha Dungwattanawanich as Pin Phopatin (Pond)
 Thanakorn Poshyananda as Head officer Panat Chatphitak
 Kiatkamol Lata as MP Kraison

Supporting cast 

 Sorawit Suboon as Dr. Chat
 Prappadon Suwanbang as That
 Ronadech Wongsaroj as Konchit
 Hansa Chuengwiwatthanawong as Ke
 Nalin Hohler as Pum
 Oak Keerati as Khana Nontan
 Vichayut Limratanamongkol as Piyawat Mettawong (Pik)
 Suphachai Suwanon as Arm
 Kantapat Permpoonpatcharasuk as Oom
 Nipaporn Thititanakarn as Jane

Guests 

 Sinjai Plengpanich as Teacher Chanthra
 Pakorn Chatborirak as Major Techat Wasutraphaisan (Ben)
 Warintorn Panhakarn as Teacher Patsakorn Wirayakan (Pat)
 Pongsakorn Mettarikanon as Khong Thamdee
 Louis Scott as Akhin Nopprasit
 Duanghathai Sathathip as Nid

References

External links 

 
 Lom Phrai Pook Rak on Thai TV 3
 Lom Phrai Pook Rak on Siamzone
 Lom Phrai Pook Rak's synopsis on online-idol
 Cholumpi Production

Thai television soap operas
2010s Thai television series
2018 Thai television series debuts
2018 Thai television series endings
Thai romance television series
Television shows set in Bangkok
Channel 3 (Thailand) original programming